Srednji Salaš is a village in Serbia. It is situated in the Bačka Topola municipality, in the North Bačka District, Vojvodina province. The village has a Serb ethnic majority and its population numbering 172 people (2002 census).

Name
In Serbian the village is known as Srednji Salaš (Средњи Салаш), in Croatian as Srednji Salaš, and in Hungarian as Szurkos.

Historical population

1961: 266
1971: 263
1981: 205
1991: 183
2002: 172

References
Slobodan Ćurčić, Broj stanovnika Vojvodine, Novi Sad, 1996.

See also
List of places in Serbia
List of cities, towns and villages in Vojvodina

Places in Bačka